Bócsa is a  village and municipality in Bács-Kiskun county, in the Southern Great Plain region of southern Hungary. It lies about 9 km northeast of Soltvadkert.

Geography

Demographics

Ethnicity
As the census of 2002 the people of Bócsa identified themselves as:

 Hungarian - 98.8%
 German - 0.2%
 Mixed/Other - 1.2%

Religion
The religious affiliations of the people of Bócsa are:

 Roman Catholic - 73.4%
 Lutheran - 9.4%
 Presbyterian - 8.7%
 Other religions - 0.4%
 Non-Religious - 8.1%

People
 Sárközy de Nagy-Bócsa family

References

Populated places in Bács-Kiskun County